The Turkish Masters is a professional ranking snooker tournament that was held for the first time in March 2022 at the Nirvana Cosmopolitan Hotel in Antalya, Turkey. The Turkish Billiards Federation, Big Break Promotions and World Snooker Tour agreed on a deal to stage the event every season until at least 2024/2025, with overall prize money increasing each year. However, the 2023 Turkish Masters, scheduled to take place from 13 to 19 March of that year, was cancelled because the local promoter could not guarantee adequate funding for the event.

Winners

References

Snooker ranking tournaments
Sports competitions in Antalya
International sports competitions hosted by Turkey
2022 establishments in Turkey
Recurring sporting events established in 2022